Devaraya Swamigal (born c. 1857) was a Tamil devotee of Lord Muruga. He is best known for his composition of the Tamil hymn Kanda Shasti Kavasam.

Biography
Not much is known about Devaraya Swamigal. He was born in 1857 in an affluent family in Vallur in the then region of Tondaimandalam. His father Shree Veeraswami Pillai served as Dubash of Mysore under the British rule, owning properties in Bangalore. Devarayan began his career as an accountant. Devaraya Swamigal's ardent inclination towards the Tamil language resulted in his learning the language under Shree Thirisipuram Meenakshi Sundaram Pillai, a pundit from Tiruchy. Soon he started writing poems, with his teacher editing and correcting them.

Devaraya Swamigal eventually wrote six hymns, popularly known as kavachams or kavasams (literally meaning "armour"), the most popular of which is the Kanda Shasti Kavacham. The other kavasams are Siva Kavacham, Shanmuga Kavacham, Shakthi Kavacham, and Narayana Kavacham. Apart from these, he also wrote Kuselopakyaanam, Thanigasala Maalai, Panchaakara Desigar Pathigam, and Seda Maalai.

See also
 Murugan
 Soolamangalam Sisters

References

External links
 Kandha sahsti kavasam reading
 Skanda sashti
 Kanda-Sashti-Kavacham-Lyrics-Tamil in Tamil
 kanthar-sashti-kavasam

Kaumaram
Indian male songwriters
Hindu poets
Tamil poets
Indian Tamil people